Stacy John Bragger (born 1984) is a Falkland Island journalist and politician who has served as a Member of the Legislative Assembly for the Stanley constituency since the 2017 general election.

Education and career 
Bragger grew up in the Falkland Islands before moving to the UK to study at Peter Symonds College and then the Surrey Institute of Art & Design. After returning to the Falklands, Bragger went on to work at Falkland Islands Radio Service, rising to the position of News Editor during which time he worked on the documentary series Falklands 30 which marked the 30th anniversary of the Falklands War and was broadcast on BBC Radio.

In 2012 he represented the Falkland Islands at the Commonwealth Youth Parliament and following the 2013 Falkland Islands sovereignty referendum, Bragger toured Latin American nations with MLA Gavin Short to promote the Islanders' position in the sovereignty dispute. In 2014 Bragger was appointed Executive Secretary for the Falkland Islands Chamber of Commerce.

Bragger has also served as Chairman of the Media Trust, Secretary of the Falkland Islands Overseas Games Association and in 2015 was the General Team Manager for the Falkland Islands at the Island Games in Jersey.

References 

1984 births
Living people
Falkland Islands journalists
Falkland Islands MLAs 2017–2021
People educated at Peter Symonds College